Girls Will Be Girls may refer to:
 Girls Will Be Girls (film), a 2003 film directed by Richard Day
 Girls Will Be Girls (TV series), a television show on The Comedy Network
 Girls Will Be Girls (Farmer's Daughter album), 1993
 Girls Will Be Girls (Klymaxx album), 1982